Jonathan Estrada Barajas (born 16 March 1998) is a Mexican professional footballer who plays as a goalkeeper for Atlético La Paz.

Honours
Tepatitlán
Liga de Expansión MX: Guardianes 2021

References

External links
 

1998 births
Living people
Mexican footballers
Association football goalkeepers
Atlas F.C. footballers
Deportivo CAFESSA Jalisco footballers
Liga MX players
Liga Premier de México players
Tercera División de México players
Footballers from Guadalajara, Jalisco